is a Japanese actress and model. Tamashiro was born to an American father and a Japanese mother. She was scouted by the president of her agency when she was walking home with her friends. In July 2012, Tamashiro won the Kodansha sponsored Miss iD 2013 Grand Prix. In a Vivi interview she said she wanted to be a "model idol".

Filmography

Film

Television drama

Awards

References

External links
  
Official profile 
アジアKawaiiを代表する写真デコ＆共有アプリ「Snapeee」 

Japanese female models
Japanese female idols
Japanese film actresses
Japanese television actresses
1997 births
Living people
Actors from Okinawa Prefecture
Japanese people of American descent
20th-century Japanese actresses
21st-century Japanese actresses